Anthony Andrew Hoekema (1913, in Drachten – 17 October 1988) was a Calvinist minister and theologian who served as professor of Systematic theology at Calvin Theological Seminary, Grand Rapids, for twenty-one years.

Biography 
Hoekema was born in the Netherlands but immigrated to the United States in 1923. He attended Calvin College (A.B.), the University of Michigan (M.A.), Calvin Theological Seminary (Th.B.) and Princeton Theological Seminary (Th.D., 1953). After pastoring several Christian Reformed churches (1944–56) he became Associate Professor of Bible at Calvin College (1956–58). From 1958 to 1979, when he retired, he was Professor of Systematic Theology at Calvin Theological Seminary in Grand Rapids, Michigan. Professor Hoekema spent two sabbatical years in Cambridge, England (1965–66, 1973–74).

Publications 
Among his best-known works are:

 The Four Major Cults: Christian Science, Jehovah's Witnesses, Mormonism, Seventh-day Adventism (1963)
 What about Tongue-Speaking? (1966)
 Holy Spirit Baptism (1972)
 Amillennialism (1977)
 The Bible and the Future (1979)
 Created in God's Image (1986)
 Saved by Grace (1989)

References

1913 births
1988 deaths
American people of Frisian descent
Dutch Calvinist and Reformed theologians
American Calvinist and Reformed theologians
People from Drachten
Dutch emigrants to the United States
University of Michigan alumni
Critics of Mormonism
Critics of Christian Science
Critics of Jehovah's Witnesses
20th-century Calvinist and Reformed theologians
20th-century American writers
Critics of Seventh-day Adventism